Rock & Roll (U.S. title) or Dancing in the Street: a Rock and Roll History (U.K. title) is a 10-part American-British television documentary series about the history of rock and roll music produced by the BBC and WGBH, and which screened in 1995 on PBS in the United States and on BBC Two in the United Kingdom during 1996.

Elizabeth Deane and Hugh Thomson were executive producer and series producer, respectively, for both the PBS and BBC versions. However different narrators were used for the two countries, with Liev Schreiber narrating for a US audience and Seán Barrett used in the UK. The music critic Robert Palmer was chief consultant on the series, which received a Peabody Award.

On PBS, funding was provided by the Corporation for Public Broadcasting, PBS viewers, Experience Music Project (five years prior to opening), the National Endowment for the Arts, RadioShack (promoting its then-sponsorship of the Rock and Roll Hall of Fame and Museum) and Boston Beer Company. Most of the titles used for the PBS "Rock & Roll" episodes differed from those given for the BBC's later "Dancing in the Street" versions.

Coincidentally, in the same year as "Rock & Roll" first screened, another 10-part documentary miniseries, "The History of Rock 'n' Roll", was produced for US television by Andrew Solt and Quincy Jones, which also covered the background of rock music.

Episodes

See also 
 The History of Rock 'n' Roll, 1995 television documentary series that originally aired on the Prime Time Entertainment Network
 Seven Ages of Rock, 2007 documentary series co-produced by the BBC and VH1 Classic

References

External links 
 
 
 PBS Rock & Roll site (archived)
 WGBH Special Collections

1995 American television series debuts
1995 American television series endings
1996 British television series debuts
1996 British television series endings
BBC television documentaries
PBS original programming
Peabody Award-winning television programs
Rock music television series
English-language television shows